A referendum on tenant and consumer protection was held in Switzerland on 13 March 1955. Voters were asked whether they approved of a popular initiative "for the protection of tenants and consumers", which would prolong price controls. Although the proposal was approved by a majority of voters, it was rejected by a majority of cantons, so did not come into force. Voters also voted on a counterproposal, which was rejected by a majority of voters and cantons.

Results

Proposal

Counter-proposal

References

Switzerland
Referendums in Switzerland
Swiss tenant